Édgar Fabian Jara Dohmann (born 8 January 1993, height: 1,67m) is a Paraguayan javelin thrower. He represented the University of Texas in the US and also Sol de América in Paraguay. Jara was coached by Olympic Athlete Claudio Escauriza and Santiago Pérez up to his arrival at the University of Texas in 2014, when he started training under American former javelin thrower, Ty Sevin .

Education
Jara attended High School at Colegio Goethe in Paraguay, where he received a distinguished student award all four years of high school. He was later a student at the University of Texas at Austin, graduating with a degree in Economics and a minor in Statistics in May 2017. He earned a Masters of Science in Finance degree from the McCombs School of Business in May 2018.

Personal life
Jara is the son of Edgar Jara and Erica Dohmann. He has two siblings, Gaspar Jara and Gustavo Jara. Jara can also speak in Spanish, German, Portuguese and Paraguayan Guaraní.

Trajectory

2010
In 2010, coached by Chilean Claudio Zúñiga, won the first Pan-American Games in Juiz de Fora, Brazil by throwing a PR of 61,10m. 
In te same year, he competed at the pre-olympics youth games in Uberlandia, Brazil and at the South-American Youth Championship una Santiago, Chile.

2011
With only 18 years old, Jara was the second youngest participant at the South-American Adult Championship in Buenos Aires, Argentina, where he-advanced to the finals and was the only javelin thrower to achieve a PR at the meet.

2012
Jara competed at the 2012 South American Under-23 Championships. The only Paraguayan thrower in the event, he reached a maximum mark of 65.72 metres and concluded in 6th position, while Argentine Braian Toledo finished in 1st place with a throw of 78.49 metres.

2013
At the 2013 Paraguayan Athletics Championships, Jara threw 63.45 metres, second behind Víctor Fatecha who reached 74 metres. He also achieved 6.22 metres in Long Jump.

2014
In 2014, Jara was one of three Paraguayan throwers to reach over 70 metres, including Víctor Fatecha and Larson Giovanni Diaz Martinez.

Athletics at the 2014 South American Games in March, 6th placed Jara threw a seasonal best of 72.35 metres, four metres less than 1st place, which was achieved by compatriot Víctor Fatecha who threw 76.09 metres.

He competed for Texas for the first time at the Big 12 Championship, where he won and threw his life time PR of 74.25m.

At the 2014 South American Under-23 Championships in October, Jara achieved 68.78 metres, winning the Bronce Medal. Throwing just over two metres more than compatriot Larson Díaz.

2015
In 2015, he won the Texas Relays and was the first Longhorn to win the Javelin after 20 years.

Jara appeared at the Sol de América Tournament in Asunción, the tournament hosted by his club of the same name.

2016

A severe injury prevented Jara from competing in the 2016 season.

2017

On his last year at the University of Texas, Jara was ranked as high as 1st in the NCAA Div I. He won his second title at the Big 12 Championship and earned All-American Status by placing 7th at the National Championship.

Competitions

International competitions

National competitions

Seasonal bests
2013 - 71.25 m
2014 - 74.25 m (PB)

Personal best
 Javelin Throw: 74.25 m  Lubbock – 16 May 2014

References

External links

Texas Sports Profile

1993 births
Living people
Paraguayan people of German descent
Paraguayan male javelin throwers
21st-century Paraguayan people